Piolanti is a surname. Notable people with the surname include:

 Antonio Piolanti (1911–2001), Italian priest
 Raphaël Piolanti (born 1967), French hammer thrower